Sandra Hirche (born 1974) is a German control theorist and engineer. She is Liesel Beckmann Distinguished Professor of electrical and computer engineering at the Technical University of Munich, where she holds the chair of information-oriented control. Her research focuses on human–robot interaction, haptic technology, telepresence, and the control engineering and systems theory needed to make those technologies work.

Education and career
Hirche was born in 1974 in Freiberg. She became a student of aerospace engineering at the Technical University of Berlin, earning a diploma in 2002. She completed her doctorate (Dr.Ing.) at the Technical University of Munich in 2005.

After postdoctoral research at the Tokyo Institute of Technology and University of Tokyo, she joined the Technical University of Munich as an associate professor in 2008. She was named Liesel Beckmann Distinguished Professor and given the chair of information-oriented control in 2013.

Recognition
Hirche was named an IEEE Fellow in 2020 "for contributions to human-machine interaction and networked control".

References

External links
Home page

Living people
German electrical engineers
German women engineers
Control theorists
Technical University of Berlin alumni
Academic staff of the Technical University of Munich
Fellow Members of the IEEE
1974 births